Simeonie Quppapik (1909–1997) was an Inuit artist.

His work is included in the collections of the National Gallery of Canada, Winnipeg Art Gallery, the Augustana Teaching Museum of Art, and the Museum of Anthropology at the University of British Columbia.

References

1909 births
1997 deaths
20th-century Canadian artists
Inuit artists
People from Kinngait